Tin(II) oxide (stannous oxide) is a compound with the formula SnO. It is composed of tin and oxygen where tin has the oxidation state of +2. There are two forms, a stable blue-black form and a metastable red form.

Preparation and reactions

Blue-black SnO can be produced by heating the tin(II) oxide hydrate, SnO·xH2O (x<1) precipitated when a tin(II) salt is reacted with an alkali hydroxide such as NaOH.
Metastable, red SnO can be prepared by gentle heating of the precipitate produced by the action of aqueous ammonia on a tin(II) salt.
SnO may be prepared as a pure substance in the laboratory, by controlled heating of tin(II) oxalate (stannous oxalate) in the absence of air or under a CO2 atmosphere. This method is also applied to the production of ferrous oxide and manganous oxide.
SnC2O4·2H2O → SnO + CO2 + CO + 2 H2O

Tin(II) oxide burns in air with a dim green flame to form  SnO2.

2 SnO + O2 → 2 SnO2

When heated in an inert atmosphere initially disproportionation occurs giving Sn metal and Sn3O4 which further reacts to give SnO2 and Sn metal.
4SnO → Sn3O4 + Sn
Sn3O4 → 2SnO2 + Sn
SnO is amphoteric, dissolving in strong acid to give tin(II) salts and in strong base to give stannites containing Sn(OH)3−. It can be dissolved in strong acid solutions to give the ionic complexes Sn(OH2)32+ and Sn(OH)(OH2)2+, and in less acid solutions to give Sn3(OH)42+. Note that anhydrous stannites, e.g. K2Sn2O3, K2SnO2 are also known.
SnO is a reducing agent and is thought to reduce copper(I) to metallic clusters in the manufacture of so-called "copper ruby glass".

Structure
Black, α-SnO adopts the tetragonal PbO layer structure containing four coordinate square pyramidal tin atoms. This form is found in nature as the rare mineral romarchite. The asymmetry is usually simply ascribed to a sterically active lone pair; however, electron density calculations show that the asymmetry is caused by an antibonding interaction of the Sn(5s) and the O(2p) orbitals. The electronic structure and chemistry of the lone pair determines most of the properties of the material.

Non-stoichiometry has been observed in SnO.

The electronic band gap has been measured between 2.5eV and 3eV.

Uses
The dominant use of stannous oxide is as a precursor in manufacturing of other, typically divalent, tin compounds or salts. Stannous oxide  may also be employed as a reducing agent and in the creation of ruby glass. It has a minor use as an esterification catalyst.

Cerium(III) oxide in ceramic form, together with Tin(II) oxide (SnO) is used for illumination with UV light.

References

Amphoteric compounds
Oxides
Reducing agents
Tin(II) compounds